4-Hydroxytestosterone (4-OHT), also known as 4,17β-dihydroxyandrost-4-en-3-one, is a synthetic anabolic-androgenic steroid (AAS) and a derivative of testosterone that was never marketed. It was first patented by G.D. Searle & Company in 1955 and is testosterone with a hydroxy group at the four position. 4-OHT has moderate anabolic, mild androgenic, and anti-aromatase properties and is similar to the steroid clostebol (4-chlorotestosterone).

See also
 4-Androstene-3,6,17-trione
 Androstenedione
 Enestebol
 Formestane
 11β-Hydroxytestosterone

References

Androgens and anabolic steroids
Androstanes
Aromatase inhibitors
Exercise physiology
Drugs in sport
World Anti-Doping Agency prohibited substances